The Burkitt Medal is awarded annually by the British Academy "in recognition of special service to Biblical Studies". Awards alternate between Hebrew Bible studies (odd years) and New Testament studies (even years). It was established in 1923 and has been awarded to many notable theologians. It is named in honour of Francis Crawford Burkitt.

List of recipients
The first recipient of the Burkitt medal was R. H. Charles (1925). Below is a full list of recipients:

1925–1999

 1925 The Ven. Archdeacon R. H. Charles
 1926 Professor F. C. Burkitt
 1927 The Rev. Canon B. H. Streeter
 1928 Professor J. H. Ropes
 1929 The Rev. Professor M.-J. Lagrange, OP
 1930 Dr. C. G. Montefiore
 1931 No Award 
 1932 Professor Alexander Souter
 1933 No Award
 1934 Sir Frederic G. Kenyon
 1935 No Award
 1936 Professor Kirsopp Lake
 1937 No Award
 1938 The Rev. Dr. W. O. E. Oesterley
 1939 The Rev. Dr. A. E. Brooke and Dr. Norman Mclean
 1940 The Rev. L. Hugues Vincent, OSD
 1941 The Rev. S. C. E. Legg
 1942 No Award
 1943 Professor S. A. Cook
 1944 The Rev. Dr. H. Wheeler Robinson
 1945 The Rev. Professor C. H. Dodd
 1946 Professor Theodore Henry Robinson
 1947 The Rev. Dr. W. F. Howard 
 1948 Professor S. H. Hooke 
 1949 Professor Sigmund Mowinckel 
 1950 The Rev. Professor T. W. Manson 
 1951 The Rev. Professor H. H. Rowley 
 1952 Professor Anton Fridrichsen 
 1953 Sir Godfrey R. Driver 
 1954 Professor P. E. Kahle and Professor Ludwig Koehler
 1955 Professor Walther Bauer 
 1956 Professor Oscar Cullmann 
 1957 The Rev. Roland de Vaux, OP
 1958 Professor Joachim Jeremias
 1959 Charles Virolleaud
 1960 The Rev. Dr. Vincent Taylor
 1961 The Rev. Professor A. R. Johnson
 1962 The Rev. Professor Matthew Black
 1963 Professor Walther Eichrodt
 1964 Professor W. D. Davies 
 1965 Professor Otto Eissfeldt 
 1966 Professor C. K. Barrett 
 1967 Professor Martin Noth 
 1968 The Rev. Professor P. Benoit, OP
 1969 Professor D. Winton Thomas
 1970 The Rev. Professor C. F. D. Moule 
 1971 Professor Ernst Kasemann 
 1972 Professor W. Zimmerli 
 1973 Professor W. G. Kummel
 1974 Professor C. J. Lindblom
 1975 Professor K. Aland
 1976 Professor E. H. Riesenfeld
 1977 Professor D. C. Westermann
 1978 Professor H. F. D. Sparks 
 1979 Professor F. F. Bruce 
 1980 Professor P. A. H. De Boer
 1981 Professor G. B. Caird 
 1982 Professor G. W. Anderson
 1983 Dom Bonifatius Fischer, OSB 
 1984 The Rev. Professor J. A. Fitzmyer, SJ 
 1985 Professor W. Mckane
 1986 Professor M. Hengel
 1987 Professor Dr R. Schnackenburg
 1988 Professor James Barr 
 1989 Professor C. E. B. Cranfield
 1990 Professor R. M. Wilson 
 1991 Professor J. A. Emerton 
 1992 Dr Ernst Bammel 
 1993 Professor Otto Kaiser 
 1994 Professor B. M. Metzger 
 1995 Professor Dr A. S. Van Der Woude 
 1996 Professor Dr E. Schweizer 
 1997 Professor R. N. Whybray 
 1998 Rev. Dr Margaret Thrall 
 1999 Professor Brevard S. Childs

2000s

2010s

2020s

See also
 Awards of the British Academy
 List of religion-related awards

References

British Academy
British awards
Academic awards
Religion-related awards